This is a list of episodes of the 1996–1999 ABC/UPN sitcom Clueless. A total of 62 episodes were produced spanning 3 seasons airing from September 20, 1996 to May 25, 1999.

Series overview

Episodes

Season 1 (1996–97)

Season 2 (1997–98)

Season 3 (1998–99)

External links
 

Clueless
Clueless